Bryan Staring (born 1 June 1987 in Perth) is an Australian Grand Prix motorcycle racer, currently competing in the 2022 Australian Superbike Championship (ASBK), aboard a Ducati Panigale V4 for Desmosport Ducati, owned by Ben Henry and three-time World Superbike Champion, Troy Bayliss. In 2017 he competed in the Australian Superbike Championship aboard a Honda CBR1000RR for Crankt Honda. He competed for Go & Fun Honda Gresini in the 2013 MotoGP World Championship. He is a former race-winner in the FIM Superstock 1000 Cup – winning three times in 2012, en route to finishing fourth in the championship – and has also competed in the Supersport World Championship and the Superbike World Championship.

Career statistics

Grand Prix motorcycle racing

By season

Races by year
(key) (Races in bold indicate pole position, races in italics indicate fastest lap)

FIM Superstock 1000 Championship

Races by year

Supersport World Championship

Races by year
(key) (Races in bold indicate pole position) (Races in italics indicate fastest lap)

Superbike World Championship

Races by year

External links

1987 births
Living people
Australian motorcycle racers
125cc World Championship riders
Supersport World Championship riders
Superbike World Championship riders
FIM Superstock 1000 Cup riders
Gresini Racing MotoGP riders
Moto2 World Championship riders
MotoGP World Championship riders